Mohamed Ibrahim (born March 11, 1985) is an Egyptian professional footballer who currently plays as a left back for the Egyptian club El Raja SC.

References

1985 births
Living people
El Raja SC players
Egyptian footballers
Association football defenders
Petrojet SC players
Haras El Hodoud SC players
Al Mokawloon Al Arab SC players
Egyptian Premier League players